The Gaiety Girl is a 1924 American silent romantic film directed by King Baggot and starring Mary Philbin.

Plot
William Tudor has a huge debt and is forced to give up his family castle. He sells it to war millionaire John Kershaw and goes to London to visit his granddaughter Irene. Meanwhile, Tudor's nephew and Irene's sweetheart Owen travels to South Africa to oversee his father's mines. Irene becomes a chorus girl at the Gaiety Theatre. Here, John's son Christopher Kershaw falls in love with her. She does not want to have anything to do with him, but becomes desperate after her father gets ill. She gets the message Owen has been killed in the war and agrees to marry Christopher. Right after the marriage, an alive Owen shows up at the castle. Meanwhile, a huge chandelier crashes down on Christopher's head. He is now killed, which makes Irene and Owen able to reunite. Owen buys the castle back from John and Irene's grandfather comes back to his home.

Cast

Preservation
With no prints of The Gaiety Girl located in any film archives, it is a lost film.

References

External links

1924 films
1924 romantic drama films
American silent feature films
American black-and-white films
Films directed by King Baggot
American romantic drama films
Universal Pictures films
Lost American films
1924 lost films
1920s English-language films
1920s American films
Silent romantic drama films
Silent American drama films